Studentlitteratur is an academic publishing company based in Sweden and publishing mostly in Swedish.  It is one of the largest producers of university text books and course books in Sweden.

The company was established in 1963 and is based in the university city of Lund.

References

External links
Official website 

Book publishing company imprints
Book publishing companies of Sweden
Mass media in Lund
Publishing companies established in 1963
1963 establishments in Sweden
Companies based in Lund
20th-century establishments in Skåne County